Offences at Sea Act or Crimes at Sea Act (with its variations) is a stock short title used for legislation in Australia, New Zealand and the United Kingdom relating to the piracy and other offences within the jurisdiction of the admiralty.

List

Australia
Commonwealth
The Crimes at Sea Act 1979 (No 17)
The Crimes at Sea Act 2000 (No 13)

New South Wales
The Crimes (Offences at Sea) Act 1980 (No 145)
The Crimes at Sea Act 1998 (No 173)

Northern Territory
The Criminal Law (Offences at Sea) Act 1978
The Crimes at Sea Act 2000 (No 73)

Queensland
The Crimes at Sea Act 2001 (No 19)

South Australia
The Crimes (Offences at Sea) Act 1980 (No 5)
The Crimes at Sea Act 1998 (No 62)

Tasmania
The Crimes (Offences at Sea) Act 1979 (No 69)
The Crimes at Sea Act 1999 (No 11)

Victoria
The Crimes (Offences at Sea) Act 1978 (No 9229)
The Crimes at Sea Act 1999 (No 56)

Western Australia
The Crimes (Offences at Sea) Act 1979 (No 96)
The Crimes at Sea Act 2000

New Zealand
The Offences at Sea Act 1953

United Kingdom
The Offences at Sea Act 1536 (28 Hen 8 c 15) 
The Offences at Sea Act 1799 (39 Geo 3 c 37)
The Offences at Sea Act 1806 (46 Geo 3 c 54) (Repealed by section 10(2) of, and Part I of Schedule 3 to the Criminal Law Act 1967)
The Offences at Sea Act 1820 (1 Geo 4 c 90) (The whole Act, so far as unrepealed, was repealed by section 10(2) of, and Part I of Schedule 3 to, the Criminal Law Act 1967)

See also
List of short titles

Lists of legislation by short title